Samuel W. Wolfson High School (or simply Wolfson) is a magnet high school located in the Duval County Public School district. As an academic magnet and college preparatory school, Wolfson specializes in Advanced Placement and International Baccalaureate courses. In addition to its academic focus, Samuel Wolfson School for Advanced Studies has a athletics program, a program for visual and performing arts, and a JROTC program.  Its name is derived from Samuel W. Wolfson, a local businessman whose family was prominent in Jacksonville, Wolfson houses the Finance, Law, and Business magnet program. A VyStar Credit Union branch is located inside the school, and is available for students and faculty to use. Wolfson is a member of the International Baccalaureate Diploma Programme. The school's main rival is the Englewood Rams.

Student body

The school is notable for its diverse student body. Students represent many foreign countries including Bosnia and Herzegovina, Albania, and Lebanon, among others. In addition, Wolfson's magnet program allows students from all over the district to attend via the AP program and the IB program.

Notable alumni

 Bob Moore (class of 1980), composer
 John Brecher (class of 1969), journalist, former wine columnist for The Wall Street Journal
 Billy Butler, MLB first baseman
 Mike Clevinger, MLB pitcher for the Chicago White Sox
 Amer Delic, professional tennis player
 Val Demings, U.S. Congresswoman representing Florida's 10th congressional district and former chief of police of the Orlando Police Department
 Ashley Greene, actress most recognized as Alice Cullen in Twilight
 Udonis Haslem, basketball player for the Miami Heat
 Eric Hurley, professional baseball player for the Minnesota Twins
 Jerry Storch, chairman and CEO, ToysRUs; CEO HBC/Saks Fifth Avenue; vice chairman, Target

References

External links
 Wolfson High School webpage
 Wolfson Athletics website
 Duval County Public Schools website

Alumni websites
 Class of '69
 Class of '70
 Class of '71

Educational institutions established in 1963
High schools in Jacksonville, Florida
Taylor Hardwick buildings
Duval County Public Schools
Public high schools in Florida
Magnet schools in Florida
1963 establishments in Florida